Kirby's Pig Stand was the first drive-in restaurant to open in the United States. It was opened by Jessie G. Kirby and Reuben Jackson in 1921, in Dallas, Texas. Then in the 1980s, it changed ownership and name to Woodfire Kirby's.

History
Kirby's Pig Stand opened in September 1921 in Dallas, Texas. It was America's first drive-in restaurant. The restaurant expanded into chains all around the United States in states such as Texas, New York, Florida, Oklahoma, Arkansas, California, and Alabama. Jessie Kirby died a few years after opening the first drive-in Pig Stand, but Kirby's family and the Jackson family kept the company up and running. The scheme of the restaurant "consisted of a red-tiled pagoda-like roof set on a rectangular building framed of wood and covered in stucco (a fine plaster used for coating wall surfaces or molding into architectural decorations)".  "A 1927 newspaper advertisement claimed over 5,000 people in Dallas alone had their evening meal at the Pig Stands". It was popular for "chicken-fried steak sandwich, fried onion rings, milkshake, pig sandwich and their Texas toast". Kirby's Pig Stands revolutionized the way Americans ate everyday meals; today there are thousands of fast food restaurants across America such as McDonald's, Burger King, Taco Bell, Wendy's and Sonic. By the end of the 1950s, all of the Pigs Stands outside of Texas had been sold, but the stands in Texas were still run by the company president Royce Hailey.  Hailey became the owner in 1975 then sold the business to his son Richard Hailey. The chain went bankrupt due to unpaid sales taxes and closed its last restaurant in 2006.

One Pig Stand still exists as of 2021, located at 1508 Broadway, San Antonio, TX 78215 near down town San Antonio.  It was purchased by Mary-Ann, a former employee, and continues to offer the same atmosphere and many menu items as the original. It has the original 40s/50s style sign near the street that is suggestive of the original time period of the business.

One of the "original" pig Stand "signature" unique Drive In buildings with the red-tiled pagoda-like roof still exists in San Antonio at the  corner of S Presa St and Pereida St.  It was one of the last three in San Antonio, operating as a Pig Stand until the 90s.  It has since been sold and now operates as a Burger restaurant with a "50s" diner style décor, similar to the previous Pig Stand.  Its Drive in awning also still exist but is now merely part of the parking lot.

Slogans
The company used various slogans throughout its tenure, including: "Quick Curb Service", "Curb Service", "Eat a Pig Sandwich", "America's Motor Lunch", and "A Good Meal at Any Time".

References

Drive-in restaurants
Restaurants in Dallas
Restaurants established in 1921
1921 establishments in Texas